André Roumieux (20 May 1932 – 18 April 2020) was a French psychiatric nurse who served at the Hospital de Ville-Évrard for 36 years. Following his retirement in 1988, he continued to write on the subject of psychiatry.

Publications
Je travaille à l’asile d’aliénés (1974)
La Tisane et la camisole, trente ans de psychiatrie publique (1981)
Artaud et l'asile (1996)
L'abbé Pierre, le pèlerin d'Emmaüs (1999)
Ville-Évrard. Murs, destins et histoire d’un hôpital psychiatrique (2008)
Les Retournaïres (2010)

References

1932 births
2020 deaths
French nurses